Allison Peak is located on the Canadian provincial boundary of Alberta and British Columbia along the Continental Divide. It was named in 1915 by Morrison P. Bridgland after Douglas Allison. Douglas Allison was a law enforcement agent.

See also
List of peaks on the Alberta–British Columbia border
List of mountains of Alberta
Mountains of British Columbia

References

Two-thousanders of Alberta
Two-thousanders of British Columbia
Kootenay Land District